Rottiers is a surname. Notable people with the surname include:

Édouard Rottiers (1898–?), Belgian sport wrestler
Karel Rottiers (born 1953), Belgian cyclist
Vincent Rottiers (born 1986), French actor

See also
Rottiers Collection, former art collections
Rottier (surname)